Camel is the debut studio album by English progressive rock band Camel, released on 28 February 1973 by MCA Records.

Timeline
By August 1972, Camel were signed to MCA Records. They quickly entered the studio to record their first self-titled album, Camel. A collection of individual songs, chiefly from Andrew Latimer and Peter Bardens, the album was greeted with muted success and MCA did not take an option for a second album. By then, the group had acquired the management team of Geoff Jukes and Max Hole of Gemini Artists (later to become GAMA Records) and had moved to Decca Records, where they would remain for the next 10 years.

Tour
Camel gigged 9 months of the year and firmly established a reputation for their live sound in the UK, Switzerland, Belgium, and the Netherlands.
They shared the stage with other artists such as Stackridge, Barclay James Harvest, Gong, Hawkwind, Pink Fairies, Global Village Trucking Company, and Spyro Gyra.

Reception
In their ranking of the band's 14 albums, Prog Sphere placed Camel at #4, calling the song "Never Let Go" the real highlight on it. They wrote "this debut is not just another example of a stepping stone, but an accomplished work in its own right. While not as good as the group’s later albums, it is a most excellent start and an essential Camel release, as well as a very good starting point to get into their wonderful music."

Reissue
The album was remastered and reissued in 2002 on London Records with two bonus tracks: the single version of "Never Let Go" and a live version of "Homage to the God of Light", a staple of the band's early shows. A studio version of the latter had appeared on keyboard player Peter Bardens' debut solo album The Answer in 1970.

Track listing

Personnel
Camel
 Andrew Latimer – guitar; vocals (1, 4)
 Peter Bardens – organ, Mellotron, piano, VCS 3 synthesizer; vocals (5, 8)
 Doug Ferguson – bass guitar; vocals (2, 6)
 Andy Ward – drums, percussion

Production
 Engineered by Roger Quested
 Sleeve design by Modula

Release details
 1973, UK, MCA MUPS 473, Release Date February 1973, LP
 1977, UK, MCA MCL 1601 Release Date Approx  1977, LP
 2002, UK, London 8829252, Release Date 3 June 2002, CD (remastered edition)

References

External links
 Official site
 Camel - Camel (1973) album review by Daevid Jehnzen, credits & releases at AllMusic.com
 Camel - Camel (1973) album releases & credits at Discogs.com
 Camel - Camel (1973) album review by Matthijs van der Lee, credits & user reviews at SputnikMusic.com
 Camel - Camel (1973) album to be listened as stream at Play.Spotify.com

Camel (band) albums
1973 debut albums
MCA Records albums
Albums recorded at Morgan Sound Studios